German Navy may refer to:

 Reichsflotte, the first German Navy
 North German Federal Navy, the Navy of the North German Confederation
 Imperial German Navy, the Navy of the German Empire
 Reichsmarine, the interwar German navy
 Kriegsmarine, the World War II navy of Nazi Germany
 Bundesmarine, the post-World War II West German navy
 Volksmarine, the post-World War II East German people's navy
 German Navy, the post-reunification German Navy (Deutsche Marine)